Acromantis is a genus of Asian praying mantids in the subfamily Acromantinae of the family Hymenopodidae.

Species
The Mantodea Species File lists:
Acromantis australis Saussure, 1871
Acromantis dyaka Hebard, 1920
Acromantis elegans Lombardo, 1993
Acromantis formosana (Shiraki, 1911)
Acromantis gestri Giglio-Tos, 1915
Acromantis grandis Beier, 1930
Acromantis hesione (Stål, 1877)
Acromantis indica (Giglio-Tos, 1915)
Acromantis insularis (Giglio-Tos, 1915)
Acromantis japonica (Westwood, 1889)
Acromantis lilii Werner, 1922
Acromantis luzonica Hebard, 1920
Acromantis montana Giglio-Tos, 1915
Acromantis moultoni Giglio-Tos, 1915
Acromantis nicobarica Mukherjee, 1995
Acromantis oligoneura (de Haan, 1942) - type species
Acromantis palauana Beier, 1972
Acromantis philippina Beier, 1966
Acromantis satsumensis (Matsumura, 1913)
Acromantis siporana Giglio-Tos, 1915

References

 
Mantodea genera
Acromantinae
Mantodea of Asia
Taxa named by Henri Louis Frédéric de Saussure